was a Japanese professional baseball player who played as two ways as a pitcher and outfielder. He spent the majority of this career with the Kintetsu Pearls/Kintetsu Buffalo/Kintetsu Buffaloes.

As a rookie in 1950, Sekine attracted attention by batting 3rd, 4th, or 5th in the Kintetsu Pearls' lineup while pitching in the game. Sekine focused on pitching from 1950 to 1957, but spent the latter half of his career (1958 to 1965) as a position player. His best year as a pitcher was 1954, when he went 16–12 with a 2.44	earned run average and 118 strikeouts. His best years as a hitter were in 1962–1963, when he hit and .301 and .296 respectively, with a total of 21 home runs and 115 RBI.

Sekine was elected to the Japanese Baseball Hall of Fame in 2003. 

Sekine died on April 9, 2020, in Tokyo, at the age of 93.

References

External links

1927 births
2020 deaths
Baseball people from Tokyo
Hosei University alumni
Japanese baseball players
Nippon Professional Baseball pitchers
Nippon Professional Baseball outfielders
Kintetsu Buffaloes players
Yomiuri Giants players
Managers of baseball teams in Japan
Yokohama DeNA BayStars managers
Tokyo Yakult Swallows managers
Japanese Baseball Hall of Fame inductees